William Jay (16 November 179217 April 1837) was an architect. He continued his father's and grandfather's interest in stonemasonry and building design.

Jay was born in Bath. His father was also William Jay, who had started working with his father as a stonemason, but became a Congregationalist minister. In 1807 the younger William became an apprentice of the architect and surveyor David Riddall Roper.

Jay's designs for Surrey Chapel Almshouses were exhibited at the Royal Academy in 1814. He designed Dr. Fletcher's Albion Chapel in London, laying the foundation stone the following year. In 1817 he moved to the United States for four years, where he established as an architect in Savannah, Georgia. His American work includes the Owens-Thomas House, the William Scarbrough House, Telfair Academy, and The Savannah Theatre. The  design of the Bulloch–Habersham House, which he designed, would later be replicated with the Habersham Memorial Hall.

When the economy of Georgia collapsed in 1822, Jay returned to England and worked primarily in Cheltenham. Later, he went bankrupt and in 1836 moved with his family to the island of Mauritius, where he was an architect and civil engineer until his death in Port Louis.

Notable works

Family
In 1827, Jay married Louisa Coulson of Henley-on-Thames. They had three children between 1829 and 1835; the oldest child, also William, died soon after the family's arrival in Mauritius at the age of six. Jay's widow and other two children returned to England after his death.

References

Further reading
 
 
 William Jay: His Life and Architecture - GoSouthSavannah.com
 Classical Savannah: Fine & Decorative Arts, 1800–1840 - Page Talbott, Telfair Museum of Art (1995)

1792 births
1837 deaths
19th-century English architects
Architects from Bath, Somerset
English stonemasons
19th-century British businesspeople